
Christiansen is a Danish and Norwegian patronymic surname, literally meaning son of Christian. The spelling variant Kristiansen has  identical pronunciation. Christiansen is the sixteenth most common name in Denmark, but is shared by less than 1% of the population.

The numbers of bearers of the surnames Christiansen and Kristiansen in Denmark and Norway (2007):

Immigrants to English-speaking countries sometimes have changed the spelling to Christianson or Kristianson.

Notable people with the surname Christiansen

A
Alex Christiansen (1925–2010), Norwegian architect
Anders Christiansen (born 1990), Dutch footballer
Anders Baasmo Christiansen (born 1976), Norwegian actor
Anna Grace Christiansen (born 1985), American cyclist
Annika Christiansen (born 1994), Faroese footballer
Arne Christiansen (1926–2012), Norwegian judge
Arthur Christiansen (1904–1963), English journalist
Asger Lund Christiansen (1927–1998), Danish cellist
Avis Christiansen (1895–1985), American lyricist

B
Bill Christiansen (1914–2000), American politician
Bob Christiansen (born 1949), American football player
Brush Christiansen, Canadian ice hockey coach
B. S. Christiansen (born 1952), Danish soldier

C
Cam Christiansen, Canadian animator
Carina Rosenvinge Christiansen (born 1991), Dutch archer
Carl Christiansen (1886–1970), Norwegian official
Carl Christiansen (rower) (1909–1990), Norwegian rower
Carl Emil Christiansen (1937–2018), Danish footballer
Case Christiansen (American baseball player)
Christian Christiansen (disambiguation), multiple people
Claus Christiansen (disambiguation), multiple people
Clay Christiansen (born 1958), American baseball player
Clay Christiansen (organist) (born 1949), American organist
Cole Christiansen (born 1997), American football player

D
Dick Christiansen (born 1931), Canadian football player
Ditlef Hvistendahl Christiansen (1865–1944), Norwegian judge
Dorte Christiansen, Danish cricketer

E
Eigil Christiansen (1894–1943), Norwegian sailor
Einar Christiansen (1861–1939), Danish journalist
Ellen Christine Christiansen (born 1964), Norwegian politician
ElRay L. Christiansen (1897–1975), American religious figure
Else Marie Christiansen (1921–2017), Norwegian speed skater
Eric Christiansen (1937–2016), English historian
Erik Christiansen (born 1956), Danish rower

F
F. Melius Christiansen (1871–1955), Norwegian violinist
Friedrich Christiansen (1879-1972), German commander
Fritz Christiansen (1889–1955), Danish wrestler

G
Gerner Christiansen (1928–2006), Danish canoer
Glen Christiansen (born 1957), Swedish swimmer
Godtfred Kirk Christiansen (1920–1995), Danish businessman
Gottlieb Bender Christiansen (1851–1929), American minister

H
Hans Christiansen (sailor) (1867–1938), Norwegian sailor
Hans Christiansen (artist) (1866–1945), German painter
Henning Christiansen (1932–2008), Danish composer
Henrik Christiansen (disambiguation), multiple people
Hugo Christiansen (born 1940), Danish rower

I
Ingeborg Christiansen (born 1930), German actress
Izzy Christiansen (born 1991), English footballer

J
Jack Christiansen (1928–1986), American football player and coach
Jackie Christiansen (born 1977), Danish Paralympic athlete
Jake Christiansen (1900–1992), American football player
Jan Christiansen (born 1941), Norwegian footballer
Jan Fredrik Christiansen (born 1942), Norwegian trumpeter
Jason Christiansen (born 1969), American baseball player
Jen Christiansen, American author
Jesper Christiansen (disambiguation), multiple people
Jessie Christiansen, Australian astrophysicist
Johannes Christiansen (1850–1913), Norwegian politician
Johan-Sebastian Christiansen (born 1998), Norwegian chess player
John Christiansen (1923–1998), American test pilot
Julie Christiansen (born 1968), Norwegian politician

K
Kaj Christiansen (1921–2008), Danish footballer and coach
Kåre Christiansen (1911–1984), Norwegian bobsledder
Karianne Christiansen (1949–1976), Norwegian skier
Keith Christiansen (born 1944), American ice hockey player
Keith Christiansen (art historian) (born 1947), American art historian
Kenneth Christiansen (disambiguation), multiple people
Kerry Ann Christiansen, British actress
Kristian Albert Christiansen (1888–1966), Norwegian politician

L
Larry Christiansen (born 1956), American chess grandmaster
Lars Christiansen (handballer) (born 1972), Dutch handball player
Lauritz Christiansen (disambiguation), multiple people
Lisa Christiansen, Canadian radio personality
Lorang Christiansen (1917–1991), Norwegian cyclist

M
Mads Christiansen (born 1986), Dutch handball player
Mads Hedenstad Christiansen (born 2000), Norwegian footballer
Majken Christiansen (born 1967), Danish vocalist
Margrethe Christiansen (1895–1971), Danish teacher
Marianne Christiansen (born 1963), Danish bishop
Mark Christiansen, Dutch badminton player
Marty Christiansen (1916–1999), American football player
Mathias Christiansen (born 1994), Danish badminton player
Max Christiansen (born 1996), German footballer
Michael Christiansen (1926/1927—1984), British newspaper editor
Michele Christiansen (born 1970), American judge
Mogens Christiansen (born 1972), Danish cricketer
Morten Christiansen (born 1978), Dutch footballer
Morten H. Christiansen, Danish cognitive scientist

N
Nanna Christiansen (born 1989), Dutch footballer
Niels Christiansen (born 1966), Danish businessman
Nils Christiansen (1913–1988), Filipino swimmer
Nina Christiansen (born 1964), Danish runner

O
Olaf Christiansen (1901–1984), American composer
Ole Kirk Christiansen (1891–1958), Danish carpenter and entrepreneur
Ove Christiansen (born 1969), Danish professor

P
Pål H. Christiansen (born 1958), Norwegian novelist
Palle Christiansen (born 1973), Greenlandic politician
Peter Christiansen (disambiguation), multiple people
Poul Simon Christiansen (1855–1933), Danish painter
Preben Christiansen (1913–1979), Danish fencer

R
Ragnar Christiansen (born 1922), Norwegian politician
Rasmus Christiansen (disambiguation), multiple people
Reggie Christiansen (born 1975), American baseball coach
Reidar Thoralf Christiansen (1886–1971), Norwegian folklorist
Richard Christiansen (disambiguation), multiple people
Rob Christiansen, American musician
Robin Christiansen (born 1950), American politician
Roger Christiansen (born 1952), American television director
Rune Christiansen (born 1963), Norwegian poet and novelist
Rupert Christiansen (born 1954), English writer

S
Sabine Christiansen (born 1957), German journalist
Sigurd Christiansen (1891–1947), Norwegian novelist
Sophie Christiansen (born 1987), British equestrian
Steve Christiansen (born 1956), American rower
Steve Christiansen (born 1961), American politician
Svein Christiansen (1941–2015), Norwegian musician

T
Tanya Christiansen, American mathematician
Thomas Christiansen (born 1973), Spanish footballer
Thomas Christiansen (diver) (1920–1998), Danish diver
Thor Nis Christiansen (1957–1981), American criminal
Thue Christiansen (born 1940), Greenlandic teacher
Tom Christiansen (born 1963), American video game developer
Tom Christiansen (ski jumper) (born 1956), Norwegian ski jumper
Tony Christiansen (born 1958), New Zealand motivational speaker
Trine Christiansen, Danish cricketer

U
Ursula Reuter Christiansen (born 1943), German filmmaker

V
Vetle Sjåstad Christiansen (born 1992), Norwegian biathlete
Vicki Christiansen (born 1960), American civil servant
Vidar Christiansen (born 1948), Norwegian economist
Villy Christiansen (born 1935), Danish canoeist

W
Wilbur Norman Christiansen (1913–2007), Australian radio astronomer

See also
Christiansen effect, a filtering effect
Christiansen filter, narrow bandpass or monochromatic optical filter
Cape Christiansen, Greenland
Christiansen Academy, private boarding school in Rubio, Táchira, Venezuela
Christensen (surname), people with the given surname "Christensen"
Christianson, people with the given surname "Christianson"
Kristiansen, people with the given surname "Kristiansen"

References

Danish-language surnames
Norwegian-language surnames
Patronymic surnames
Surnames from given names